Yakcheonsa is a Buddhist temple of the Jogye Order on Jeju island, South Korea.

History 
The story of the founding of Yakcheonsa Temple is unknown as there are no remaining records. During the Unified Silla era, there was a big international temple called Beophwasa  located halfway up Mt. Hallasan, which is not far from the temple, and its associated hermitages would have been scattered nearby.

Yakcheonsa Temple is located on a site where a mineral water spring flows from the ground year round. Long before 1982, when the temple was established, Yaksuam Hermitage was located there. According to some records, Ven. Bang Donghwa stayed at the hermitage in the Jungmun area for a while to recover his health after he was released from prison. He was imprisoned in 1918 because of his involvement with the anti-Japanese independence movement initiated by the Jejudo religious community.

For centuries, locals in the region had called the site of the spring “Dwaeksaemi,” a Jejudo word meaning “a mineral spring with good quality water.” According to another story, in the 1960s, a Confucian scholar named Kim Hyeong-gon was praying for 100 days in a small cave. He drank some mineral water given to him in a dream and recovered his health. He then built Yaksuam to express his gratitude to the Buddha and did his Buddhist practice there until the end of his life.

Architecture
Before Ven. Hyein built Yakcheonsa, the site was occupied by Yaksuam, a thatched roof hermitage in the traditional architectural style of Jejudo. It was a modest 59 square meters (640 square feet) building that stood on 1,490 square meters (16,010 square feet) of land. Full-scale construction on Yakcheonsa began in 1982, and the 30 meter (98 feet) high Daejeok-gwangjeon was built to include a basement. Then a three-story dormitory, also with a basement, was built with passageways that connect to Daejeok-gwangjeon. That dormitory also has a dining hall and concession stand that sells basic necessities. Eventually, an underground Dharma hall, a Samseonggak, a pagoda to enshrine relics, large fountains and a pond were also added. Yakcheonsa is now an iconic Jejudo temple.

Korea's largest Vairocana Buddha and 18,000 small Buddhas are enshrined in Yakcheonsa's Dharma hall, and its temple bell weighs 18,000 kilos (39,680 pounds). They seem to reflect the past glory of the temple that once stood on this site. It is said that the mineral water spring washes away the suffering and tears of sentient beings, and that is why Yakcheonsa Temple was built here. The temple also enshrines the spirit tablets of past royalty such as King Munjong and his wife Queen Hyeondeok, King Yeongchinwang and his wife Lady Yi Bang-ja.

Similar to other Buddhist temples in South Korea, Yakcheonsa has facilities for lay brethren to stay, eat, and meditate, in addition to participating in Buddhist rituals.

Tourism  
It also offers temple stay programs where visitors can experience Buddhist culture.

Gallery

References

External links
 Yakchunsa official website(in English)

Buddhist temples of the Jogye Order
Buddhist temples in South Korea
Tourist attractions in Jeju Province
Buildings and structures in Jeju Province